Anomocaridae is a family of trilobites, containing the following genera:

Abharella
Afghanocare
Amginia
Anomocare
Anomocarina
Anomocarioides
Anomocariopsis
Callaspis
Chondranomocare
Dilatalimbus
Elandaspis
Eocatuniella
Forchammeria
Formosocephalus
Fuquania
Glyphanellus
Glyphaspellus
Guizhouanomocare
Hanivella
Harataspis
Hunanaspis
Igarkiella
lohomia
Irinia
Jimanomocare
Juraspis
Kokuria
Kolbinella
Kotuia
Leichneyella
Lomsucaspis
Longxumenia
Macrotoxus
Metanomocare
Nadiyella
Palella
Paracoosia
Parakotuia
Paranomocare
Pjatkovaspellus
Qinlingia
Rectifrontinella
Sachaspis
Schoriecare
Schoriella
Scintilla
Sivovella
Usovinurus
Wutingshania
Yongwolia

References

 
Anomocaroidea
Trilobite families